Pseuderia samarana is an endemic species of plant in the family Orchidaceae found in Samar Island and is the first generic record for the genus Pseuderia in the Philippines.  The species is initially terrestrial during its seedling stage, then becomes epiphytic upon reaching maturity. It shared similarities with P. floribunda, and P. frutex. However, the species scented, 2-flowered inflorescence significantly differs from the latter, along with its narrower labellum and the characteristically entire clinandrium margins. The species is considered Critically Endangered, and is found only in top portion of forest over limestone, and is threatened by land use conversion, timber poaching, and slash-and-burn farming.

Description
Pseuderia samarana is an initially terrestrial orchid during its seedling stage, then becomes epiphytic upon reaching maturity. The clinandrium has a characteristically entire margin.

Taxonomy and naming
The species is named from its type province of Samar, where this place forms the large portion of Samar Island Natural Park.

Distribution and habitat
This endemic orchid species is only known from near Samar Island, Philippines on forests over limestone formation with an elevation of 250-880 m.

Conservation
As assessed, P. samarana is calculated to have an area of occupancy of 8 km2 and an extent of occurrence as 0.166 km2. Also, the species is can only be found on top portion of forest over limestone in its type locality, where its small population of 20-30 species are threatened by land use conversion and timber poaching, among others. With these factors, P. samarana is placed under the IUCN3.1 criteria as Critically Endangered.

References

Eriinae
Endemic flora of the Philippines